David V (Davit' V; died 1155), of the Bagrationi Dynasty, was a 7th king of Georgia in 1154 before his death in 1155

He was an elder son of King Demetre I. Fearing that Demetre would make his younger son Giorgi an heir to the throne, David attempted a revolt in 1130. Ultimately, he forced his father to abdicate and David became a king in 1154 or 1155.

The Georgian and Armenian chronicles are confused about the length and nature of David V’s reign and disagree over the circumstances of his mysterious death. According to the Armenian chronicler Vardan Areveltsi, he ruled for a month and was murdered by his nobles, Sumbat and Ivane Orbeli, who had made a secret agreement with George, David’s younger brother. The Armenian Stepanos Orbelian, a descendant of the Orbeli clan, writing shortly after Vardan, claims David reigned for two years and denies any family involvement in the murder of the king and says that George had sworn to his reigning brother that he would rule only until David’s son, Demna, reached his majority, but then reneged on his vow. He claims that the Orbelis had been the witnesses of this vow and that they led the 1177 revolt to restore Demna, who was now adult, to his rightful position. Georgian chronicles say David’s reign lasted for six months, but carefully avoid any mention of the circumstances of his death.

See also
List of Georgian Kings

1155 deaths
Bagrationi dynasty of the Kingdom of Georgia
Kings of Georgia
12th-century murdered monarchs
Eastern Orthodox monarchs
Year of birth unknown